ONB may refer to:
 Old National Bancorp, stock symbol (an American holding company of Old National Bank)
 One Network Bank, a rural bank in Mindanao, Philippines
 Opera Nazionale Balilla, an Italian Fascist youth organization
 Order of New Brunswick, a Canadian decoration (post-nominal letters)
 Orthonormal basis, a notion in linear algebra
 Österreichische Nationalbibliothek, the national library of Austria

See further:
 OeNB for Oesterreichische Nationalbank